The grey-headed parrotbill (Psittiparus gularis) is a parrotbill in the family Sylviidae and is found in eastern Asia from the Himalayas to Indochina and Hainan.

Taxonomy and systematics
The grey-headed parrotbill was alternatively considered as a member of the Old World babblers (family Timaliidae) or with the Sylviidae, but is now classified in the distinct family Paradoxornithidae by the IOC. Until 2008, the black-headed parrotbill was also considered as a subspecies of the grey-headed parrotbill.

Distribution and habitat
The natural habitat of the grey-headed parrotbill is subtropical or tropical moist montane forests.

References

 BirdLife International 2004.  Paradoxornis gularis.   2006 IUCN Red List of Threatened Species.   Downloaded on 26 July 2007.
 Robson, C. (2007). Family Paradoxornithidae (Parrotbills) pp. 292 – 321   in; del Hoyo, J., Elliott, A. & Christie, D.A. eds. Handbook of the Birds of the World, Vol. 12. Picathartes to Tits and Chickadees. Lynx Edicions, Barcelona.

External links
 Grey-headed parrotbill video on the Internet Bird Collection

grey-headed parrotbill
grey-headed parrotbill
Birds of Eastern Himalaya
Birds of South China
Birds of Laos
Birds of Myanmar
Birds of Vietnam
grey-headed parrotbill
grey-headed parrotbill
Taxonomy articles created by Polbot